Ryan Pryce may refer to:

 Ryan Pryce (Lost), a character on the American TV series Lost
 Ryan Pryce (footballer) (born 1989), English football goalkeeper